The Life and Works of Hungarian Writers edited by Pál Gulyás – a new series of a large-scale, broader Hungarian literary lexicon from the first half of the 20th century. Publishing of the work stalled in the 1940s and then resumed in the 1990s. In the early 2000s, due to lack of funds, they stopped publishing again, the remaining (considerable) part is still in manuscript. With its 19 published volumes and manuscripts, it is probably the largest single Hungarian literary work in existence.

Order of volumes 
The series, like other contemporary lexicons, uses column numbering instead of a page. On a printed page, the text is divided into two columns, which means that the number of columns is exactly twice the actual number of pages.

Sources 
 Gulyás Pál: Magyar írók élete és munkái – új sorozat, Magyar Könyvtárosok és Levéltárosok Egyesülete, Budapest, 1939–1944, az I. kötet Előszava
 Magyar katolikus lexikon I–XV. Főszerk. Diós István; szerk. Viczián János. Budapest: Szent István Társulat. 1993–2010.  Magyar írók élete és munkái
 http://gulyaspal.mtak.hu/
 Nekrológ Viczián János emlékére 
 Czigány Lórántː Szinnyei–Gulyás–Viczián; inː Magyar Könyvszemle, 1997/1
 Hanthy Kingaː Gulyás, a világszám. Mire telik a magyar tudomány pénzéből? ; inː Magyar Nemzet, 2003. ápr. 12.

Hungarian encyclopedias